Jorge Hernández (born 20 June 1965) is a Puerto Rican sailor. He competed in the Tornado event at the 2004 Summer Olympics.

References

External links
 

1965 births
Living people
Puerto Rican male sailors (sport)
Olympic sailors of Puerto Rico
Sailors at the 2004 Summer Olympics – Tornado
Sportspeople from San Juan, Puerto Rico